Assefa Mezgebu (born June 19, 1978 in Sidamo) is a retired Ethiopian long-distance runner, most known for winning a bronze medal in the 10,000 metres event at the 2000 Summer Olympics. He was also the runner-up at the 2001 World Championships in Athletics, following a bronze medal at the 1999 World Championships in Athletics. He also competed in cross-country running and reached the podium at the IAAF World Cross Country Championships in 1998 and 2000.

Assefa Mezgebu is the younger brother of Ayele Mezgebu.

International competitions

Personal bests
3000 metres - 7:28.45 min (1998)
5000 metres - 12:53.84 min (1998)
10,000 metres - 26:49.90 min (2002)

External links

1978 births
Living people
Sportspeople from Oromia Region
Ethiopian male long-distance runners
Ethiopian male cross country runners
Olympic athletes of Ethiopia
Olympic bronze medalists for Ethiopia
Olympic bronze medalists in athletics (track and field)
Athletes (track and field) at the 1996 Summer Olympics
Athletes (track and field) at the 2000 Summer Olympics
Athletes (track and field) at the 2004 Summer Olympics
Medalists at the 2000 Summer Olympics
African Games gold medalists for Ethiopia
African Games medalists in athletics (track and field)
Athletes (track and field) at the 1999 All-Africa Games
Goodwill Games medalists in athletics
World Athletics Championships medalists
World Athletics Championships athletes for Ethiopia
Competitors at the 2001 Goodwill Games
Goodwill Games gold medalists in athletics